The list of shipwrecks in 1965 includes ships sunk, foundered, grounded, or otherwise lost during 1965.

January

1 January

3 January

6 January

7 January

13 January

15 January

18 January

20 January

22 January

24 January

25 January

29 January

31 January

February

4 February

11 February

13 February

16 February

17 February

19 February

26 February

28 February

March

9 March

10 March

11 March

19 March

26 March

27 March

29 March

April

4 April

6 April

11 April

13 April

27 April

28 April

29 April

30 April

Unknown date

May

2 May

5 May

7 May

8 May

9 May

18 May

23 May

26 May

28 May

29 May

Unknown date

June

4 June

6 June

17 June

27 June

July

1 July

13 July

14 July

15 July

17 July

18 July

20 July

22 July

27 July

31 July

Unknown date

August

1 August

2 August

6 August

15 August

20 August

22 August

23 August

25 August

28 August

30 August

31 August

September

2 September

7 September

9 September

10 September

14 September

20 September

22 September

26 September

28 September

30 September

October

5 October

6 October

8 October

10 October

11 October

16 October

17 October

18 October

22 October

26 October

27 October

29 October

30 October

November

1 November

2 November

3 November

7 November

8 November

13 November

14 November

16 November

18 November

19 November

22 November

23 November

24 November

26 November

27 November

28 November

Unknown date

December

1 December

4 December

13 December

18 December

22 December

24 December

27 December

30 December

Unknown date

References

See also 

1965
 
Ships